Acha-Kayyngdy (formerly Oy-Tersken) is a village in Naryn Region of Kyrgyzstan. It is part of the At-Bashy District. Its population was 5,181 in 2021.

Population

References

Populated places in Naryn Region